Maria River, a watercourse of the Hastings River catchment, is located in the Mid North Coast region of New South Wales, Australia.

Course and features
Maria River rises on the eastern slopes located in Kumbatine National Park, near the village of Kundabung, west of Crescent Head, and flows generally east, south southeast, and then southwest, joined by two tributaries including the Wilson River, before reaching its confluence with the Hastings River, west of Port Macquarie. The river descends  over its  course.

See also

 Rivers of New South Wales
 List of rivers of New South Wales (A–K)
 List of rivers of Australia

References

External links
 

 

Rivers of New South Wales
Mid North Coast
Port Macquarie-Hastings Council